Vivian Wilson Fernandes (born 2 October 1990), known by his stage name Divine (stylized as DIVINE), is an Indian rapper born in Mumbai, Maharashtra. He started to gain popularity after the release of his song "Yeh Mera Bombay" (2013). He broke through with the release of his song "Mere Gully Mein" (2019) featuring the Mumbai-based rapper Naezy.

On 12 December 2020, Divine became the first Indian rapper to be featured on Spotify Times Square billboard in New York City for his album Punya Paap (2020), which had claimed the top spot on Apple Music India. He made his debut at the 64th Annual Grammy Awards in 2022 becoming the first Indian hip-hop star to attend the Grammys. He is well known to represent street life of Mumbai.

Career

Early years 
Divine started his career as an underground rapper in 2011 after discovering hip hop on a T-shirt. A friend of his wore a T-shirt of 50 Cent's first album Get Rich or Die Tryin' at school. The same friend gave him his first MP3 CD with hip-hop music on it which inspired him to start rapping in English. He was part of the hip hop crew Mumbai's Finest. He often raps about his own life experiences, such as the life of the poor people in Mumbai and his upbringing with a single mother. He cites American rappers such as Nas, Eminem, Big L, Tupac, 50 Cent and Rakim as his influences.

Rise to success 
Following the release of his song "Yeh Mera Bombay", Divine obtained the attention of Sony Music India while performing at the Blue Frog Festival 2014 in Mumbai, and shortly after signed a contract with them. Divine made a debut position in the Indian Hip Hop World. Representing Gully Gang the biggest rap club of India. Divine is one of the top most rapper known for his independent position. 

The song later won the Best Video of the Year award by Rolling Stone India that same year. He released his breakout single "Mere Gully Mein" featuring Naezy on 16 April 2015. The song went viral and many Bollywood celebrities shared it on social media. He collaborated with Indian DJ Nucleya on the track "Jungle Raja" from Nucleya's album Bass Rani, which helped him gain even more popularity. The song won Best EDM track of the Year at the GiMA Awards in 2016.

On 24 March 2016, his debut solo single "Jungli Sher" was released and it ruled the charts because of its raw depiction of the life of the poor in Mumbai. He took the song to the Breakfast Show ahead of BBC Asian Network Live on 29 April 2016. He appeared on the BBC Asian Network on the Charlie Sloth Show; he was the first Hindi-speaking rapper to freestyle on the show and also the first to rap in Hindi with the name-giving host in attendance. He was also featured on Brapp TV.

Divine also collaborated with Nucleya on another hit track, "Scene Kya Hai" off Nucleya's album Raja Baja. He was featured on "Daru Daru" with Deep Jandu and Gangis Khan, his first commercially oriented song, which came out on 10 January 2017. His next solo single, "Farak", was released on 16 February 2017 and topped the Indipop charts on iTunes India. He appeared as a feature on the record City Slums by Indian-American rapper/singer/songwriter Raja Kumari in May 2017. City Slums was further certified triple platinum In India by IMI.

In 2018, Divine terminated his contract with Sony Music India. He released a remix to Lil Pump's "Gucci Gang" called "Gully Gang" independently on 18 January 2018. The song was perceived well by both critics and fans and helped him garner more attention. On 5 April 2018, he followed up with "One Side" produced by Byg Byrd. The video was produced by Red Bull Media House and came out on the rapper's own YouTube channel.

His next single, "Teesri Manzil", earned him a copyright strike from Zee Music Company a few hours after its release and was deleted from his channel. It was eventually re-released on 14 December 2018 with some changes in the lyrics. He released "Junoon", the intro to his upcoming first full-length album, on 10 November 2018. The album's name, Kohinoor, was announced on 13 February 2019 on Apple Music's Beats 1 radio show hosted by Ebro Darden. The album release was announced to be sometime in April 2019 but was finally released later. In July 2019, Divine released a documentary film about his career so far entitled Gully Life - The Story of Divine. It first aired on TV on channels such as the Discovery Channel and was released on Divine's YouTube channel a week later.

On 20 August 2019, Nas' Mass Appeal Records and Universal Music India launched Mass Appeal India and signed Divine. Universal Music Group and Mass Appeal jointly took the step to take him to India and globalize the Indian hip-hop scene. On 20 August 2019, in an interview with Nas published on Mass Appeal India's YouTube channel, and Universal Music India's Facebook Page, Nas revealed that Divine's debut album Kohinoor was set to release soon. It was released on 9 October 2019 and featured all-new tracks recorded specifically for the album.

In 2021, GQs global editions nominated a local artist across a world of genres and Divine was among the 21 most exciting young musicians. He appeared on a cover of the Metallica song "The Unforgiven" with Vishal Dadlani and Shor Police, for the charity tribute album The Metallica Blacklist, released in September 2021.

In 2021, he won the award for Best Indian Act at the MTV Europe Music Awards.

 Film contributions 
Divine made his Bollywood debut in the film Mukkabaaz with the song "Paintra". The track was another collaboration with Nucleya and was released on 1 December 2017. He collaborated with famous Indian music director and singer Amit Trivedi for the Irrfan Khan-starring film Blackmail on the song "Badla", which was released on 16 March 2018 via T-Series. Divine also contributed to the soundtrack for Sacred Games, an Indian Netflix original series. It features his song "Jungli Sher" as well as "Kaam 25" produced by Indo-Canadian producer Phenom, which was made specifically for the series. Its music video was released on 14 June 2018 on both Divine's and Netflix's YouTube channels, with the version on Netflix featuring English subtitles.

Divine most notably contributed to the soundtrack of Gully Boy by Zoya Akhtar, a 2019 film inspired by the lives of Naezy and himself, with Ranveer Singh and Alia Bhatt starring. Divine and Naezy both helped as consultants to get an authentic representation of hip hop culture for the film. Their song "Mere Gully Mein" was remade with Ranveer Singh rapping Naezy's lyrics as part of the film. Divine provided additional rap lyrics for Ranveer Singh's character and composed some of the songs for the original soundtrack. A promotional single featuring American artist Nas as well as Naezy, divine and Ranveer Singh was released on JioSaavn shortly prior to the film's release.

 Punya Paap 
On 20 September 2020 Divine appeared on the international remix of "Bando Diaries" by UK rapper Dutchavelli alongside OneFour from Australia, Noizy from Albania and Kekra from France. On 23 September 2020, he released his new song and video, "Punya Paap", on Mass Appeal India's YouTube channel. It was announced to be the first single off his second album, also entitled Punya Paap.

On 16 October 2020, he released "Mirchi", the second single from the album. The song with its prominent baile funk sound was well received. Another track from the album, "Mera Bhai", had its music video launched on 6 November 2020. The animated video portrays a story where one of Divine's childhood friends betrays him out of jealousy and ends with his message to the listeners to trust no one but themselves in today's world.

His second album, Punya Paap, was released on 3 December 2020, under the label Mass Appeal India. It consists of 11 tracks, with features from Nas, Cocoa Sarai, Dutchavelli, Stylo G, D'Evil, MC Altaf, Lisa Mishra and Phenom. The album has a blend of old-school 808 patterns and new heavy, trap-hop beats with a lot of sampled loops, produced by some of the finest producers from the Indian hip-hop scene, including Stunnah Beatz, iLL Wayno, and Karan Kanchan. The album has an overall ominous theme, and chronicles Divine's struggles and rise to the top in the Indian hip-hop scene.

2022 - present
In November 2022, he released his third album titled Gunehgar. The album prominently features international artists and producers.

 Gully Gang Entertainment 
In February 2019 Divine announced the founding of a new company, Gully Gang Entertainment, a venture that includes a record label "Gully Gang Records", to recruit and produce hip hop talent in the Mumbai area. The song "Gully Gang Cypher" released on 22 May 2019 as the first collaboration of the label's artists such as the emerging rap quartet Aavrutti, solo hip-hop artists D’Evil, MC Altaf and Shah Rule as well as music producer Karan Kanchan. Artists from outside of Mumbai too have been signed, for instance, 100RBH from Amravati and Tsumyoki from Goa.

 Discography 

 Albums 

 Singles discography 
 As lead artist 

 As featured artist 

 Promotional tracks 

 Film soundtrack 

 Awards and nominations 

 Documentaries 
 Gully Life - The Story of Divine.'' 2019 documentary, Discovery Channel, 50 minutes.

References

External links 
 

Indian rappers
Musicians from Mumbai
Living people
Filmfare Awards winners
1991 births